Gosford and Water Eaton is a civil parish in the Cherwell district of the county of Oxfordshire, England. It is north of the city of Oxford and is crossed nearby by two major roads for, or by-passing, the city. The parish contains the village of Gosford and the hamlet of Water Eaton and as at the 2011 census had 1373 people resident across its 8.75 km².

References

Civil parishes in Oxfordshire